Amir Shayesteh Tabar  (born 7 April 1967) is an Iranian artist, painter, poet and filmmaker.

Amir Shayesteh Tabar is best known for "The Blue Symphony", a collection of unique individual artworks, the entire artworks expressing the words of the Basmala, بسم الله الرحمن الرحيم (translated as "In the name of God, the most graceful, the most merciful") and were entirely created with vector based files in the 1990s. With "The Blue Symphony", Shayesteh Tabar creates a series of unique artworks by arranging the words of the Basmala into sophisticated geometrical patterns. The method of creation is entirely executed with digital means in the early stages of computer graphics. Shayesteh Tabar states that he spent more than 16 years on the completion of "The Blue Symphony" and four years for the calibration of the colours alone. The artist's hallmark is his meticulous attention to details while targeting major social, cultural or political themes such as the concept of the divine, world peace or the significance of art in society.

On 30 September 2022 it was announced by the curatorial committee of Florence Biennale that the motto for the 14th edition, which will take place in Florence, Italy, from 14 to 22 October 2023, will be "I am You - Individual and Collective Identities in Contemporary Art and Design" and that the event will be in large parts dedicated to the struggle of Iranian women for their rights. On this occasion, Florence Biennale signed an international petition initiated by Shayesteh Tabar, calling for an increased engagement on behalf of the global community of artists to support the cause of the Iranian people as "true artists" and to become the "voice of those who are left without any help".

Early years 
Amir Shayesteh Tabar is a Persian Iranian, born into a simple family in Tehran. His parents were originally from Tabriz but moved to Tehran during the Second World War. His father was a merchant working as a wholesaler at the food market. Shayesteh Tabar received a BA degree in Industrial Management from Allameh Tabataba'i Universität in Tehran. During his time as a student he dedicated more of his time to studying and practising arts, including photography, poetry, calligraphy and history of arts, than to his university subjects. He went on to attend painting classes offered by Iranian masters Rouein Pakbaz, Bahram Kha'ef and Mehrdad Moheb-Ali, but stuck to his decision to continue working as a self-taught artist. 

During his time of studying of Islamic art, he realised that after the Islamic Golden Age, most of the Islamic designs created around the world began to follow the same patterns and outlines, continuing for centuries. This eventually led to his desire to become a source of innovation in the field of Islamic Arts.

Artistic features 
The title of each artwork of "The Blue Symphony" takes its name from a specific sura of the Quran. The patterns visible in the digital artworks are essentially interwoven words and letters forming the Arabic phrase, "In the name of the Lord, the most merciful and the most gracious", using the Persian font, Nastaligh. Unlike in calligraphy, the expression doesn't arise from the words themselves but rather their fusion leads to the creation of something new. Beauty and meaning are not created solely through the skilled generation and arrangement of letters but rather through intricate, expressive and evolving combinations of colours, letters and geometrical patterns leading to a unique and distinguishable piece of art. 

Focusing not exclusively on Islamic culture, "The Blue Symphony" adopts influences from the Persian creators of the Golden Age of Islamic art, the cultures of India, Morocco and from works of the Baroque period of Western civilisation. 

Shayesteh Tabar has been an early advocate for the digitalisation of the arts by pointing out the advantages digital artworks have over their physical counterparts, namely their accessibility, transportability, indestructibility, scalability and verifiability through the use of digital storage tools and the recent blockchain technology. Furthermore, he makes the point that the possibility of creating digital signatures allows those, who have less money to spend on art, to become owners of original pieces of art and that there is an infinite amount of use cases for digital artworks since they can be printed, displayed on screens, integrated into the architectural features of buildings or even be used as holograms. 

Shayesteh Tabar describes it as his "dream to see these patterns used for cityscapes, buildings, mosques, interiors, jewellery, fashion garments, carpets, and other objects. "For the Islamic world, this is about reaffirming our identity, bringing children in touch with our rich artistic history, and absorbing fine art in life to create beauty and harmony outside and within."

Vision 
Amir Shayesteh Tabar's professional approach is rooted in the belief that art should be widely accessible, enjoyed by all, and protected from censorship. He envisioned the revolutionary potential of the application of digital technologies in art as early as in the early 1990's. His reasoning was that, particularly through the use of blockchain technology, the authenticity and non-fungibility of digital creations could be guaranteed while making it possible for artworks to be preserved in the digital space theoretically forever.

Digitally created artworks display the same characteristics as traditional ones, apart from being non-physical in nature, as their creation requires a certain artistic skill and inspiration. Furthermore, they are not re-edited nor can they be duplicated and their originality can be traced back and verified on the blockchain. Shayesteh Taber uses advanced vector scaling technology to skillfully arrange letters and create depth in his Blue Symphony artworks. Shayesteh Tabar strongly believes that the future of the arts will be digital and open to everyone.

Exhibitions 
Shayesteh Tabar held several solo exhibitions in various countries around the world and was awarded the President's Award "Lorenzo Il Magnifico" at the 2009 Florence Biennale for his unique approach and contribution to the arts with his Blue Symphony collection.

Blue Symphony Foundation plans 
Shayesteh Tabar intends to create a Blue Symphony foundation that will pursue his vision of arts without borders, with world-class art available to everyone and intellectual properties being protected through the use of blockchain technology. The foundation aims to encourage young people, especially from marginalised parts of society, to become involved in the arts and to become creators of their own destiny.

Furthermore, the foundation seeks to implement peacemaking initiatives that foster intercultural and interreligious dialogue and a more conscious use of society's resources.

References

External links
Official Internet Presence
Blue Symphony Official Channel
Interview: The artist Amir Shayesteh Tabar
Interview with Amir Shayesteh Tabar, Golestan-e Quraan Magazine – April 2001 "in Persian"
Exhibition in Quraan Cultural Complex 2003 . نمایش بسم الله در مجموعه سمفونی آبی

20th-century Iranian poets
1967 births
Living people
Iranian artists
21st-century Iranian poets